Paper Boy is a 2018 Telugu-language romantic drama film written and produced by Sampath Nandi and directed by V. Jayashankarr. The leading actors are Santosh Sobhan, Riya Suman, and Tanya Hope. It was released on 31 August 2018.

Synopsis
Ravi is a paper boy who is in a relationship with a rich girl, Dharani. However, the social inequality between them poses a threat to the future they plan on having together.

Plot

Megha (Tanya Hope) who lives in Mumbai finds out she only has few days to live due to a rare genetic disorder, and wants to know her true purpose in life. At a temple, she comes across a page from a diary, intrigued at the words written in it, she gets the diary and starts reading. It contains the love story of Ravi, a paper boy and Dharani (Riya Suman), a rich girl. Dharani's parents have a problem with her choice and troubles arise for the young couple - breaking them apart.

The story in the Diary ends on a cliff-hanger, so Megha travels to Hyderabad based on the address found in the book in search of Ravi and Dharani, to find out what really happened. Megha finds Dharani there in Ravi's house but learns the shocking truth that Ravi's dead although she didn't witness it exactly.

By chance, they come across a unique bouquet of flowers, that is basically Ravi's signature. With the new hope that Ravi's alive, Megha, her fiance and Dharani go in search of the bouquet maker's address. They finally reach Pune, a cottage with flowers fields but a nearby stranger confirms that no one with the name of Ravi live there.

Disappointed and in tears, Dharani and gang leave but she soon catches the sight of a dog (Appu) running behind their car. The dog leads them to Ravi who's working in the garden and they happily reunite.
Megha is glad that her purpose in life is to unite these lovers. The movie ends on a note that there is sincerity in Ravi and Dharani's love, hence they are able to find their way back to each other.

Cast 
 Santosh Sobhan as Ravi 
 Riya Suman as Dharani 
 Tanya Hope as Megha 
 Posani Krishna Murali
 Annapoorna
 Bittiri Satti as himself 
 Sunny as Patanjali
 Abhishek Maharshi
 Mahesh Vitta as Sarpam
 Aman Saini as Karan
Lahari Shari as Priya
 Vidyullekha Raman

Music 
The music was composed by Bheems Ceciroleo, and the audio was released through Times Music label.

Release 
Paper Boy was released on 31 August 2018.

Critical reception 
The film received 3 stars out of five in a review by 123telugu.com.

References 

2018 romantic drama films
2010s Telugu-language films
Indian romantic drama films
Films scored by Bheems Ceciroleo